Trangviksposten is a satirical newspaper parody created by Jacob Hilditch. It first appeared as a feuilleton in the newspaper Aftenposten, a parody of a fictional local newspaper in a small town. Among illustrators were Olaf Gulbransson, Theodor Kittelsen and Øyvind Sørensen. Trangviksposten was published in three book volumes between 1900 and 1907.

The 1927 film Den glade enke i Trangvik was based upon Hilditsch's stories and characters.

References

Norwegian books
1900 books